Robert Edwin Charles (24 July 193617 April 2016) was an Australian politician. He was a Liberal member of the Australian House of Representatives from March 1990 to October 2004, representing the Division of La Trobe, Victoria.

Charles was born in Covington, Kentucky and educated at Purdue University BSc (MechEng). He was an engineer before entering politics. He was a foreman, supervisor, International Marketing Manager and Managing Director of an instrument company and Chairman and Managing Director of a construction company. He moved to Australia in 1969, became a citizen of Australia in 1974, and was first elected to the La Trobe seat in 1990.

Charles was a member of the Opposition Shadow Ministry 1994–96. He retired at the 2004 election. In 2005, Charles was appointed as the Australian Consul-General in Chicago.

Charles died on 17 April 2016, aged 79.

References

1936 births
2016 deaths
Liberal Party of Australia members of the Parliament of Australia
Members of the Australian House of Representatives
Members of the Australian House of Representatives for La Trobe
Politicians from Covington, Kentucky
Purdue University College of Engineering alumni
American emigrants to Australia
21st-century Australian politicians
20th-century Australian politicians
Consuls-General of Australia in Chicago